A Firearms Enquiry Officer (FEO) is a civilian member of most police forces in the United Kingdom, who is responsible for investigation issues related to firearms, to make sure they are in compliance with United Kingdom gun laws.

FEOs carry out personal visits to applicants' homes as part of the application process for firearms or shotgun licence, or explosives certificate, to ensure that they meet the legal requirements as to secure storage of the weapons or explosives. They also carry out background checks on applicants for firearms licenses to ensure that the applicant has no previous record of firearms-related crimes or history of mental instability. They also perform similar checks when licences are renewed, to reassess licensees.

FEOs also make visits to the homes of licensed firearm owners and shooting clubs to assess the security that the firearms are kept in; if this is not up to standard the licence may be put in jeopardy.  (However, other than as above, such visits are strictly ultra vires and therefore, under Law, a Certificate Holder has no need to comply with such visits.)

FEOs are full-time members of staff employed by the specific Police Force that they work for, and usually part of an enquiry team, though in smaller stations they may work on their own. They work closely with Authorised Firearms Officers and Specialist Firearms Officers as their jobs are related.

References 

Law enforcement titles
Police positions in the United Kingdom
Firearm laws